Damián Josue Carcelén Delgado (born 3 August 1998) is an Ecuadorian Paralympic athlete who competes in long jump and sprinting events at international track and field competitions. He is a Parapan American Games silver medalist and a World silver medalist.

References

1998 births
Living people
Paralympic athletes of Ecuador
Ecuadorian male sprinters
Ecuadorian male long jumpers
Athletes (track and field) at the 2016 Summer Paralympics
Athletes (track and field) at the 2020 Summer Paralympics
Medalists at the 2019 Parapan American Games
Medalists at the World Para Athletics Championships